Donilon is a surname. Notable people with the surname include: 

Mike Donilon (born  1959), American lawyer and campaign consultant
Thomas E. Donilon (born 1955), American lawyer, business executive, and 23rd National Security Advisor